Marrion Douglass Roe (later Beck; 3 April 1935 – 29 June 2017) was a New Zealand swimmer who represented her country at the 1954 British Empire and Commonwealth Games and the 1956 Summer Olympics.

Biography
Born in Invercargill on 3 April 1935, Roe later moved to Hamilton, and represented Waikato at the New Zealand national swimming championships. In all, she won eight national swimming titles: the 100 yards freestyle every year from 1952 to 1956; the 220 yards freestyle in 1954 and 1956; and the 440 yards freestyle in 1956.

In 1954, Roe swam at the British Empire and Commonwealth Games in Cardiff. In the 110 yards freestyle, she finished fourth in the final, with a time of 1:08.9. She recorded a time of 5:34.7 in her heat of the 440 yards freestyle and did not progress to the final.

In February 1955, Roe swam what was at that time the fastest 100 yards freestyle in the Southern Hemisphere, recording a time of 59.0 seconds, which was 0.9 seconds outside Jody Braskamp's world record.

She competed in 100 metres and 400 metres freestyle at the 1956 Summer Olympics in Melbourne. In the 100 metres she finished in seventh place in the final with a time of 1:05.6, while in the 400 metres she swam 5:18.5 to finish fourth in her heat and did not progress to the final.

In early 1957, Roe married John Aitchison Beck, who was secretary of the Waikato Swimming Centre. On their honeymoon, she gave a demonstration at a swimming carnival in Gisborne.

Marrion Beck was widowed by the death of her husband in 2010. She died at Puriri Court Rest Home in Whangārei on 29 June 2017.

References

1935 births
2017 deaths
Sportspeople from Invercargill
New Zealand female swimmers
New Zealand female freestyle swimmers
Commonwealth Games competitors for New Zealand
Swimmers at the 1954 British Empire and Commonwealth Games
Olympic swimmers of New Zealand
Swimmers at the 1956 Summer Olympics
20th-century New Zealand women
21st-century New Zealand women